Reflections is the fortieth studio album by B.B. King, released in 2003. It pays tribute to the big band sound of King's youth.

Critical reception
PopMatters wrote that "among all the honorable, likable, vaguely disappointing numbers, there is one song, King's own 'Neighborhood Affair,' that provides a startling reminder that B.B. King is not simply a blues icon, not simply the affable symbol of a music that even non-fans can identify." The Washington Post called the album "safe and predictable" and "a minor footnote" in King's career.

Track listing
"Exactly Like You" (Jimmy McHugh & Dorothy Fields) - 3:21
"On My Word of Honor" (Jean Miles, Katherine Harrison) - 3:22
"I Want a Little Girl" (Billy Moll, Murray Mencher) - 2:48
"I'll String Along with You" (Al Dubin, Harry Warren) - 3:31
"I Need You" (Ronald Irwin Satterfield, Laury Steve Bruce) - 3:03 
"A Mother's Love" (Clyde Otis) - 2:59
"(I Love You) for Sentimental Reasons" (Deek Watson, William Best) - 3:31
"Neighbourhood Affair" (B.B. King, Jules Bihari) - 4:27
"Tomorrow Night" (Lonnie Johnson) - 3:38
"There I've Said it Again" (Redd Evans) - 3:30
"Always on My Mind" (Johnny Christopher, Mark James, Wayne Carson) - 3:57
"Cross My Heart" (Don Robey) - 4:29
"What a Wonderful World" (Bob Thiele, George David Weiss) - 3:57

Personnel
B.B. King – vocals, guitar
Doyle Bramhall II – guitar
Nathan East – bass guitar
Joe Sample – piano, electric piano (Fender Rhodes: tracks 1, 3, 7, 10), (Wurlitzer: 5, 13)
Toby Baker – piano, programming, electric piano (Fender Rhodes: 11, 12), (Wurlitzer: 6)
Tim Carmon – piano (7), Hammond B3 organ
Nicky Shaw – programming
Abraham Laboriel Jr. – drums

References

2003 albums
B.B. King albums
MCA Records albums